Note may refer to:

Music
The Note (album), a 2005 Bane album
"The Note" (song), a 1985 song from Daryle Singletary's album Ain't It the Truth
 "The Note", a song by Man Overboard from Heavy Love

Television
The Note (ABC News), a summary and analysis of political news stories by ABCNews.com
"The Note" (Dynasty), a fourth-season episode of American television drama series Dynasty
"The Note" (Seinfeld), a third-season episode of the American television comedy series Seinfeld
The Note (film), a 2007 TV movie shown on Hallmark Channel

Other
The Note (video game), a 1997 video game released for the PlayStation
The Notes, a 1976 novel by José Saramago

See also 
 Note (disambiguation)